Gabriela Chmelinová (née Navrátilová; born 2 June 1976) is a retired Czech tennis player.

Chmelinová has won six singles titles and 55 doubles titles on the ITF Circuit in her career. On 23 June 2003, she reached her best singles ranking of world No. 258. On 25 July 2005, she peaked at No. 55 in the doubles rankings.

Until 2003, Navrátilová played mainly on the ITF Women's Circuit in Europe, garnering over 60 titles. From 2004, she began to play exclusively in doubles and became a more active participant on the WTA Tour. She reached six finals and the semifinals of the 2005 Australian Open, partnering with Michaela Paštiková. She announced her retirement in November 2008.

In November 2014, in a comeback in an ITF tournament in Poland, she reached the finals partnered with Karolína Muchová. In 2016, Chmelinová retired again from the professional tennis tour.

She is related to Martina Navratilova by her paternal grandfather.

WTA career finals

Doubles: 6 (6 runner-ups)

ITF finals

Singles: 12 (6–6)

Doubles: 87 (55–32)

Doubles performance timeline

References

External links
 
 

1976 births
Living people
Czech female tennis players